Penn Township is a township in Madison County, Iowa, in the United States.

History
Penn Township was established in 1858.

References

Townships in Madison County, Iowa
Townships in Iowa
1858 establishments in Iowa